Philippe  Gaubert (5 July 1879 – 8 July 1941) was a French musician who was a distinguished performer on the flute, a respected conductor, and a composer, primarily for the flute.

Biography
Gaubert – commonly referred to as Gauberto – was born in Cahors but moved to Paris with his parents when he was six. His mother, who worked as a housekeeper, occasionally cleaned the apartment of Paul Taffanel, who began teaching Philippe the flute. Taffanel was Professor of Flute at the Paris Conservatoire, and Gaubert began studying there in 1893, aged 13.<ref>'Philippe Gaubert (1879-1941), Chamber Music'. at MusicWeb International</ref> 

He became one of the most prominent French musicians between the two World Wars. After a prominent career as a flautist with the Paris Opéra, he was appointed in 1919, at the age of forty, to three positions that placed him at the very centre of French musical life: 
 Professor of flute in the Conservatoire de Paris (teacher of Marcel Moyse)
 Principal conductor of the Paris Opéra
 Principal conductor of the Orchestre de la Société des Concerts du Conservatoire

In 1907, he participated in the first performance of Maurice Ravel's Introduction and Allegro for harp, flute, clarinet and string quartet. Among his recordings as conductor, one that he made of César Franck's Symphony in D minor (with the Conservatoire forces) is particularly notable.

In 1941, Gaubert died of a stroke in Paris.

Legacy
 Gaubert's playing can be heard on a series of recordings for the French Gramophone Company in 1919.
 His Méthode complète for flute, a collaboration with Taffanel, was published in 1923.
 Journalist Jean Bouzerand, Gaubert's friend, convinced the town of Cahors to create a public garden in Gaubert's honour near the river Lot in the late 1930s.
 When Gaubert was still alive, Albert Roussel dedicated the movement "Monsieur de la Péjaudie" in his piece Joueurs de flûte, op. 27 for flute and piano to him.

Honours
Gaubert was appointed Chevalier de la Legion d'honneur in 1921.

Selected works
Chamber music
 3 Aquarelles, for flute, cello and piano
 Ballade, for flute and piano
 Ballade for viola and piano (1938)
 Berceuse, for flute and piano
 Cantabile et scherzetto, for cornet and piano (1909)
 Concert in F, for orchestra (1932)
 Divertissement Grec, for 2 flutes and harp
 2 Esquisses, for flute and piano
 Fantaisie, for clarinet & piano
 Fantaisie, for flute and piano
 Gavotte en rondeau (after Lully's Les Ballets du roi), for flute and piano
 Les Chants de la mer, for orchestra (1929)
 Madrigal, for flute and piano
 Morceau symphonique, for trombone and piano
 Médailles antiques, for flute, violin and piano
 Nocturne et allegro scherzando, for flute and piano
 Pièce romantique, for flute, cello, and piano
 Romance, for flute and piano (1905)
 Romance, for flute and piano (1908)
 Sicilienne, for flute and piano
 Sonata for Flute and Piano, No. 1
 Sonata for Flute and Piano, No. 2
 Sonata for Flute and Piano, No. 3
 Sonatine, for flute and piano
 Suite, for flute and piano
 Sur l'eau, for flute and piano
 Symphony in F major, for orchestra (1936)
 Tarantelle, for flute, oboe and piano

Vocal
 Soir paien, for voice, flute and piano
 Vocalise en forme de barcarolle, for voice and piano

Media

References

External links
 Brief biographical sketch of Philippe Gaubert on the Naxos Records site
  Société des concerts du Conservatoire
 
 Phillip Gaubert - Classical Archives

1879 births
1941 deaths
19th-century classical composers
19th-century French composers
19th-century French male musicians
20th-century classical composers
20th-century French composers
20th-century French conductors (music)
20th-century French male musicians
Burials at Père Lachaise Cemetery
Chevaliers of the Légion d'honneur
Academic staff of the Conservatoire de Paris
French ballet composers
French classical composers
French classical flautists
French male classical composers
French male conductors (music)
People from Cahors
Prix de Rome for composition
Occitan musicians
20th-century flautists